Kasey William Kiker (born November 19, 1987) is an American former Minor League Baseball pitcher. He was selected by the Texas Rangers in the first round (12th overall) in the 2006 Major League Baseball Draft. Kiker was also a pitcher for the USA during the 2009 Baseball World Cup.

A top prospect at one time, Kiker struggled in the minor leagues and was released by the Rangers in 2011.

References

External links

1987 births
Living people
People from Phenix City, Alabama
Baseball players from Alabama
Baseball pitchers
Spokane Indians players
Clinton LumberKings players
Bakersfield Blaze players
Myrtle Beach Pelicans players
Frisco RoughRiders players
Rockford RiverHawks players